Euomphaloceras is an early Upper Cretaceous ammonite genus, (Cephalopoda, Ammonoidea), included in the Acanthoceratinae until established as the type genus for the Euomphaloceratinae by Cooper, 1978.

The shell is very evolute, all whorls exposed, and rather depressed, with prominent umbilical and ventrolateral tubercles on some or all main ribs. The Venter broad and flat with three rows of tubercles that are more numerous than the ventrolateral ones. May have shallow ventral constrictions.  Derivation is from an evolute Acathoceras.

References 

 W.J. Arkell et al., 1957. Mesozoic Ammonoidea; Treatise on Invertebrate Paleontology,Part L, Mollusca 4. Geological Society of America and University of Kansas Press.

Acanthoceratidae
Cretaceous ammonites
Ammonitida genera
Ammonites of North America
Cenomanian life